The 14311 / 14312 Ala Hazrat Express (via Ahmedabad) had been started in the memory of Ala Hazrat Ahmed Raza Khan,a reformer of the 19th century.

About the Train

 Ala Hazrat Express The 14311/14312 Via Ahmedabad & 14321/14322 Via Bhildi Express train belonging to Indian Railways that runs between Bareilly and Bhuj in India. It is a daily service. It operates as train number 14311/14321 from Bareilly to Bhuj and as train number 14312/14322 in the reverse direction.

Coach Composition

The train has standard LHB rakes with max speed of 130 kmph. The train consists of 22 coaches:

1 AC II Tier
4 AC III Tier
10 Sleeper coaches
5 General
2 Seating cum Luggage Rake

Service

The Ala Hazrat Express covers the distance of 1543 km in 32 hours as 14312/14311 & 1410 km in 28 hours 10 mins as 14322/14321.

Route & Halts
The important stops of the train include:

 
 
 
 
 
 
 
 
 
 
 
 
 
 
 
   (Ahmedabad)

Traction

Both trains are hauled by a Sabarmati Loco Shed based WDP-4D diesel locomotive from Bhuj up to Ajmer after which a Ghaziabad Loco Shed based WAP-5 / WAP-7 electric locomotive hauls the train towards remaining of the journey till Bareilly.

Rake sharing
The train shares its rake with 14321/14322 Ala Hazrat Express (via Bhildi).

Direction reversal

It reverses one time at,
 .

Arrival and departure time
Ala Hazrat Express 14311 leaves from its source point, Bareilly (BE) at 06:35 AM and reach its destination Bhuj at 02:00 PM next day.
Ala Hazrat Express 14312 leaves Bhuj at 12.25 PM and reach Bareilly (BE)at 08:30 PM next day. During its journey it travels via 42 stations before reaching its destination.

See also 

 Bareilly Junction railway station
 Bhuj railway station
 Ala Hazrat Express (via Bhildi)

References

Transport in Bhuj
Trains from Bareilly
Named passenger trains of India
Rail transport in Gujarat
Rail transport in Rajasthan
Transport in Kutch district
Rail transport in Haryana
Memorials to Ahmed Raza Khan Barelvi
Express trains in India